Miriam Yeung is a Hong Kong singer and actress. She has won numerous awards since her debut in 1995.

Acting-related

Film

Television

Music-related

Commercial Radio Hong Kong Ultimate Song Chart Awards
The Ultimate Song Chart Awards Presentation (叱咤樂壇流行榜頒獎典禮) is a cantopop award ceremony from one of the famous channel in Commercial Radio Hong Kong known as Ultimate 903 (FM 90.3).  Unlike other cantopop award ceremonies, this one is judged based on the popularity of the song/artist on the actual radio show.

Yeung has won eleven of these awards since 1994 including a gold for Ultimate Female Artist in 2004.

IFPI Hong Kong Sales Awards
IFPI Awards is given to artists base on the sales in Hong Kong at the end of the year.

Jade Solid Gold Top 10 Awards
The Jade Solid Gold Songs Awards Ceremony(十大勁歌金曲頒獎典禮) is held annually in Hong Kong since 1984.  The awards are based on Jade Solid Gold show on TVB. Yeung won the "Most Popular Female Artist" award twice and in 2010, she won "Asia's Most Popular Female Artist", which is one of the most prestigious awards in JSG.

Metro Showbiz Hit Awards
The Metro Showbiz Hit Awards (新城勁爆頒獎禮) is held in Hong Kong annually by Metro Showbiz radio station. It focus mostly in cantopop music.

Metro Radio Mandarin Music Awards

RTHK Top 10 Gold Songs Awards
The RTHK Top 10 Gold Songs Awards Ceremony(:zh:十大中文金曲頒獎音樂會) is held annually in Hong Kong since 1978.  The awards are determined by Radio and Television Hong Kong based on the work of all Asian artists (mostly cantopop) for the previous year. 
Miriam has average of 2 award per year since 1999 and a total of 23 awards since 1996.

Sprite Music Awards
The Sprite Music Awards Ceremony is an annual event given by Sprite China for work artists performed in previous years; awards categorized as 2005 are actually for the work and accomplishment for 2004.

Hosting-related

References

Yeung, Miriam
Yeung, Miriam
Cantopop